The 2020–21 season was Newcastle Jets' 20th season since its establishment in 2000. The club participated in the A-League for the 16th time.

Players

Transfers

Transfers in

From youth squad

Transfers out

Contract extensions

Technical staff

Pre-season and friendlies

Competitions

A-League

League table

Results summary

Result by round

Matches
The 2020–21 A-League fixtures were announced on 24 November 2020.

Statistics

Appearances and goals
Players with no appearances not included in the list.

Goalscorers

Disciplinary record

Clean sheets

References

Newcastle Jets FC seasons
2020–21 A-League season by team